This following is an episode list for the Czech sitcom Comeback, which premiered on TV Nova on 4 September 2008.

Season 1

Season 2

References

External links
 
 

cz:Seznam epizod seriálu Comeback

Lists of comedy television series episodes
Lists of sitcom episodes
Lists of Czech television series episodes